Baleiichthys is an extinct genus of prehistoric bony fish that lived during the Middle Jurassic epoch.

References

External links
 

Prehistoric teleostei
Middle Jurassic fish